Chieuti is an Arbëreshë town and comune in the province of Foggia in the Apulia region of southeast Italy.

External links
(it) (en) Chieuti

References

Arbëresh settlements
Cities and towns in Apulia